The Heythrop Library is a theological library in London, England. Part of University of London, it was initially the library for the now closed Heythrop College. The library still operates independently of the closed college.  

The library serves the Jesuit community in the United Kingdom, with The Telegraph calling it "one of the oldest and most important libraries of theological and philosophical books in the UK".

Since 2019, its reading room has been housed at the London Jesuit Centre, Mount Street, Mayfair, London and other materials through Senate House Library. 

The library is open to "anyone with a serious interest in theology or philosophy and the related academic disciplines represented in the collection", with different membership options available (from "free" to an annual charge). Current HE students, Jesuits and other Religious, as well as those unemployed or on low wages might be able to benefit from free membership. The Library continues to provide historic as most-current research, in print, to those in training for ministry in the Catholic and other Christian churches and of the wider academic community. It also supports those engaged in programmes at the London Jesuit Centre.

The library is a member of ABTAPL (the Association of British Theological and Philosophical Libraries).

History 
Some of the collection of today's Heythrop Library dates back to 1614, when the Jesuits founded a college in Leuven, for educating future Jesuit priests preparing for work in what was then the English mission. The collection was later at St Bueno's College, where it was used by Jesuit poet Gerard Manley Hopkins.

Heythrop College opened in 1926 in Oxfordshire, and became a college of the University of London in 1970, closing in 2019. Since 2019 its library has continued to serve students and researchers, its collection now available through Senate House Library and a reading room at the London Jesuit Centre; ca. 4,000 incunabula and rare books of the Heythrop College Library are housed at Campion Hall, Oxford.

Collection 
The library holds over 213,000 volumes, though the reading room at Mount Street only contains 6,000 volumes plus the latest issues of journals the library subscribes to. The collection focuses on material in theology, philosophy and some allied disciplines; with particular strong holdings in (Roman Catholic and) Christian theology, philosophy and spirituality (especially relating to  Ignatian Spirituality) and the Society of Jesus). In the 1980s the Heythrop Library also housed books from the Linacre Centre Library collection.

References

External links 

 Heythrop Library (at the London Jesuit Centre) 
 Heythrop Library on Twitter

Libraries in London
1614 establishments in England
Society of Jesus